D.A.V. College is a private aided college based in Jalandhar, Punjab, India. It was founded in 1918 by Pt. Mehar Chand. The college admits both undergraduates and post-graduates, and career-oriented programs under the purview of Guru Nanak Dev University, Amritsar.

The college offers various undergraduate and 14 postgraduate courses in sciences, humanities and commerce streams. Additionally, there are seven career-oriented programmes under UGC Scheme. There are 22 departments in the college with well qualified faculty.

The college also has a Senior Secondary wing for 10+1 and 10+2 system which runs under the ambit of PSEB Mohali.
The college has large, beautiful campus which houses a well stocked library, an auditorium, seminar halls and canteens. There is an open air theatre for cultural activities. It also offers hostel facility to both girls and boys. The college has a large ground lying a few hundred meters away from the campus. The college also boast off its swimming pool as well.

Alumni 
 KR Rohit ( Blockchain Developer)
 Jagjit Singh (singer)
 Sukhwinder Singh (singer)
 Hans Raj Hans (singer)
 Sharat Sabharwal (Indian ambassador to Pakistan)
 Janak Singh Gill
Surender Mohan Pathak (indian fiction novelist)
Om Prakash Puri(P.A in Indian Embassy in China,Pakistan & Algeria,I.F.S).
 Tejwant Kittu (music director)
 Harjit Singh Grewal (Politician)

References

Education in Jalandhar
Universities and colleges in Punjab, India
Educational institutions established in 1918
1918 establishments in India